is a Japanese voice actress and singer who is affiliated with Stardust Promotion. She is known for her roles as Ruise Sanjō in Seiren and Amana Ōsaki in The Idolmaster Shiny Colors. She is also a member of the idol unit SoundOrion.

Filmography

Anime
2016
Orange as Nagano (episode 2)

2017
Seiren as Ruise Sanjō
A Centaur's Life as Inukai

2019
BanG Dream! 2nd Season as Live guest
Hitori Bocchi no Marumaru Seikatsu as Ito Kurie

2020
Yatogame-chan Kansatsu Nikki as Mutsuki Ittenmae

2022
RPG Real Estate as Mona
Teppen!!!!!!!!!!!!!!! Laughing 'til You Cry as Iroha Akishika
Harem in the Labyrinth of Another World as Miria

2024
The Idolmaster Shiny Colors as Amana Ōsaki

TBA
The Demon Sword Master of Excalibur Academy as Sakuya

Games
2018
The Idolmaster Shiny Colors as Amana Ōsaki

References

External links
Agency profile 

1995 births
Living people
Japanese voice actresses
Stardust Promotion artists
Voice actresses from Osaka Prefecture